Ronald John Kasper (22 March 1946 – 22 January 2020) was a New Zealand cricketer. He played first-class cricket for Auckland and Natal between 1966 and 1979. He later worked as a cricket coach in Auckland.

See also
 List of Auckland representative cricketers

References

External links
 

1946 births
2020 deaths
New Zealand cricketers
Auckland cricketers
KwaZulu-Natal cricketers
Cricketers from Auckland